Bergþóra Árnadóttir (15 February 1948 – 8 March 2007) was an Icelandic folk song composer and singer. Many of her songs were built around the lyrics of Icelandic poets. In the mid 1970s, she hosted and performed in one of Icelandic TVs first music shows, Kvartett Guðmundar Steingríms.

She was the mother of Pirate Party's leader Birgitta Jónsdóttir.

See also 

 List of Icelandic writers
 Icelandic literature

References 

1948 births
2007 deaths
Bergthora Arnadottir
20th-century Icelandic singers
20th-century Icelandic women singers